John D. Coleman (born 1943) is a member of the Northeastern University athletics Hall of Fame. Coleman was inducted in 1981 for excellence in baseball. Coleman is also well known for his 37 years as the head baseball coach at Boston Latin.

Coleman was a defensive specialist as a catcher for the Northeastern Huskies as well as being a respected hitter. Coleman helped to lead the Huskies to the NCAA District I playoffs versus Maine at Fenway Park. 

The Baltimore Orioles drafted Coleman in the first college draft in 1965. Coleman advanced to the Triple A with the Rochester Red Wings but never was able to crack the majors. 

After retiring Coleman headed to Boston Latin where he coached both baseball and hockey at the high school. During the 37 seasons for which he was coach, Coleman became one of the most victorious coaches in state history. His career baseball record was 470-235.

His hockey accolades over the 37 seasons were well marked as well. In hockey his career record was 462-230-54.

His teams have qualified for the state tournament in the two sports an incredible 64 times in a combined 73 seasons. 

"Coach Coleman instilled us with great discipline, which I know prepared me for college and Olympic hockey," US Olympian and NHL player Jack O'Callahan, "He cared about his players, more as people than as athletes, and that goes a long way in life."

References

External links 
 GoNU.com Hall of Fame Profile

1943 births
Living people
Northeastern Huskies baseball players
Bluefield Orioles players
Rochester Red Wings players
Miami Marlins (FSL) players